, son of Iehira, was a kugyō or Japanese court noble of the Kamakura period (1185–1333). He held a regent position kampaku in 1330 and from 1336 and 1337.

References
 

1302 births
1352 deaths
Fujiwara clan
Konoe family